Luhu may refer to:

Luhu, Indonesia, small town in Seram Island
Luhu language, an Austronesian language spoken in the west of Seram Island 
Type 052 destroyer (Luhu class destroyer), one of the first modern multi-role guided missile destroyers built by China. 
Hohhot Black Horse (Shanxi Wosen Luhu)